Sir Barry Denny, 2nd Baronet (died 20 October 1794) was an Anglo-Irish politician, chiefly remembered for his death in a duel at the hands of John Gustavus Crosbie.

Career
He served as an officer in the Kerry Militia, eventually becoming a Major. Following his father's death in April 1794, he became a baronet and was elected to his late father's seat in the Irish House of Commons, representing Kerry. He also served as High Sheriff of Kerry in 1794.  The Denny family were the dominant political influence in Tralee, where they owned most of the houses.

At a by-election for the seat in October that year, Denny promised to remain neutral and not come between the Crosbie, Blennerhassett and Herbert families who were contesting the seat. One of the candidates, John Gustavus Crosbie, took offence at one of Denny's remarks which he took to be a breach of his position of neutrality, and challenged him to a duel. Denny was shot through the head and killed by Crosbie in the ensuing duel.

He was about to be raised to the Peerage of Ireland as Baron Denmore when he was killed. The killing resulted in a bitter feud between the two families, and John Crosbie's sudden death in 1797 led to a local tradition that he had been poisoned by the Dennys in revenge.

Family
Denny was the eldest son of Sir Barry Denny, 1st Baronet and his wife and cousin Jane Denny.

Barry Denny married Anne Morgell, the daughter of Crosbie Morgell, on 12 January 1794, when she was only sixteen, but died without issue, his title passing to his brother Edward. His widow remarried General Sir John Floyd, 1st Baronet, who died in 1818. They had no children, but she was fond of her stepdaughter Julia, and helped to arrange her marriage, which turned out very happily, to Sir Robert Peel. Robert and Julia nicknamed Anne "the Dow" (Dowager).

References

Year of birth uncertain
1794 deaths
Baronets in the Baronetage of Ireland
18th-century Anglo-Irish people
Irish MPs 1790–1797
High Sheriffs of Kerry
Duelling fatalities
Members of the Parliament of Ireland (pre-1801) for County Kerry constituencies